The 1952 winners of the Torneo di Viareggio (in English, the Viareggio Tournament, officially the Viareggio Cup World Football Tournament Coppa Carnevale), the annual youth football tournament held in Viareggio, Tuscany, are listed below.

Format

The 16 teams are organized in knockout rounds, all played single tie.

Participating teams

Italian teams

  Bologna
  Fiorentina
  Genoa
  Inter Milan
  Milan
  Napoli
  Novara
  Sampdoria
  Viareggio

European teams

  Partizan Beograd
  Dinamo Zagreb
  1860 München
  First Vienna
  Nice
  Racing Paris
  Bern

Tournament fixtures

Champions

Footnotes

External links
 Official Site (Italian)
 Results on RSSSF.com

1952
1951–52 in Italian football
1951–52 in French football
1951–52 in Yugoslav football
1951–52 in Austrian football
1951–52 in Swiss football
1951–52 in German football